Melampyrum is a genus of about 20 species of herbaceous flowering plants in the family Orobanchaceae known commonly as cow wheat. They are native to temperate regions of the Northern Hemisphere. They are hemiparasites on other plants, obtaining water and  nutrients from host plants, though they are able to survive on their own without parasitising other plants.

Melampyrum species are used as food plants by the larvae of some Lepidoptera species, including the mouse moth (Amphipyra tragopoginis).

Phylogeny
The phylogeny of the genera of Rhinantheae has been explored using molecular characters. Melampyrum appears as a distant relative of other genera of Rhinantheae. It is the sister group of two clades: (i) Rhynchocorys, Lathraea, and Rhinanthus ; and (ii) the core Rhinantheae containing Bartsia, Euphrasia, Tozzia, Hedbergia, Bellardia, and Odontites.

Taxonomy

Selected species
 Melampyrum arvense (field cow-wheat). Europe.
 Melampyrum cristatum (crested cow-wheat). Europe.
 Melampyrum klebelsbergianum. Asia.
 Melampyrum koreanum. Asia.
 Melampyrum laxum. Asia.
 Melampyrum lineare (narrowleaf cow-wheat). North America.
 Melampyrum nemorosum (wood cow-wheat). Europe.
 Melampyrum pratense (common cow-wheat). Europe.
 Melampyrum roseum. Asia.
 Melampyrum saxosum. Europe.
 Melampyrum sylvaticum (small cow-wheat). Europe.

References

External links

Orobanchaceae genera
Orobanchaceae
Taxa named by Carl Linnaeus
Parasitic plants